Mount Didgori, 1647 m, is situated some 40 km west of Georgia’s capital Tbilisi in the eastern part of the Trialeti Range, which is part of the Lesser Caucasus. It was a site of the celebrated victory won by the Georgian king David IV over the Seljuk armies on August 12, 1121. The battlefield extends for several kilometers and is covered by abundant subalipine meadows. Early in the 1990s, an impressive monument was erected at the site of the battle, consisting of dozens of massive swords pushed into the ground and posing as crosses, and colossal sculptures of dismembered bodies of warriors scattered in the meadows. The monument is located at 41º45'38 N, 44º30'29 E. 

Didgori is also the name of a Georgian Armoured Personnel Carrier.

Didgori